Pârteşti may refer to several places in Romania:

Pârteștii de Jos, a commune in Suceava County
Pârteştii de Sus, a village in Cacica Commune, Suceava County